William Moore Bell Nanson (12 December 1880 – ) was an English rugby union player.  He gained 2 caps for England, versus France and Wales in the 1907 Home Nations Championship and associated match v France.  He was killed at Gallipoli in the First World War.

As well as playing for England, he also played club rugby for Carlisle, and county rugby for Cumberland.

References

1880 births
1915 deaths
British military personnel killed in World War I
English rugby union players
England international rugby union players
Carlisle RFC players